The Grès de l'Infralias is a geological formation in France. It dates back to the Rhaetian.

Vertebrate fauna

See also 
 List of dinosaur-bearing rock formations

References 

Geologic formations of France
Triassic System of Europe
Rhaetian Stage
Sandstone formations
Paleontology in France